Number 72 (Fighter) Squadron of the Royal Air Force is a training squadron that is currently based at RAF Valley using the Beechcraft Texan T.1 to deliver Basic Fast Jet Training (BFJT). 

It was previously based at RAF Linton-on-Ouse using the Short Tucano T.1, a modified version of the Brazilian Embraer EMB-312 Tucano training aircraft. No. 72 Squadron started its service life supporting the army during World War I on operations in Middle East and afterwards was quickly disbanded. In its second incarnation the squadron was a real fighter unit, transitioning from Gloster Gladiator biplanes to Gloster Javelin all-weather jets, in between flying the Supermarine Spitfire during the Battle of Britain. The jets went in 1961 and from then until 1 April 2002 the squadron flew helicopters in the transport role.

The squadron nickname, "Basutoland", is derived from the fact that during both world wars, the Basutoland Protectorate, now Lesotho,  donated aircraft to RAF, which were assigned to No. 72 Squadron.

History

First World War
No. 72 Squadron was formed on 28 June 1917 at Upavon as a squadron of the Royal Flying Corps. On Christmas Day, the squadron left for the Middle East and regrouped at Basra on 2 March. Here, they split in three flights, each assisting the Army in their various missions, and were disbanded in Baghdad on 22 September 1919.

Second World War

No. 72 Squadron was reformed at RAF Tangmere on 22 February 1937 from 'B' flight of No. 1 Squadron. In 1939, the squadron was outfitted with Supermarine Spitfires which replaced the Gloster Gladiators that came with the flight from No. 1 Squadron. These were used in Air defence and convoy protection duties following the start of World War II. Then, in 1940, the squadron moved to assist in the evacuation of Dunkirk.

During the Battle of Britain, No. 72 Squadron spent the early days at RAF Acklington as part of No. 13 Group, before moving south during September to aid the main defence force. The squadron was then moved to North Africa to support the Tunisian campaign before being supplied with the updated Spitfire Mk.IX in 1942. They then assisted the British 8th Army as they advanced through Italy and France up until the German surrender. At this point they were moved to Austria. It was here they were disbanded on 30 December 1946 at Zeltweg.

Post-War jets

The squadron was reformed on 1 February 1947 at RAF Odiham by renumbering No. 130 Squadron. They took over No. 130 Squadron's de Havilland Vampire F.1s, making no haste to remove that units 'AP' code. The Vampire soldiered on for three versions until it gave way to the Gloster Meteor F.8 in 1952, and when the squadron was given a night-fighter role in February 1956 these were replaced with Meteor NF.12s and Meteor NF.14s. In April 1959, the squadron got the all-weather fighter role and was given Gloster Javelin FAW.4s and later Javelin FAW.5s. These were flown until the squadron was disbanded at RAF Leconfield on 30 June 1961.

Helicopters

On 15 November 1961, No. 72 Squadron was reformed at RAF Odiham, but now as a helicopter unit. They were equipped with twin-rotor Bristol Belvederes HC.1s until the Westland Wessex HC.2 replaced these aircraft in August 1964. For the next thirty-eight years they continued to use these aircraft and in that time the squadron saw action in Malaya, provided post-disaster assistance following the Torrey Canyon tanker disaster in 1967 and supported the security forces in Northern Ireland from 1969. During the mid 1970s the squadron also operated a SAR 'D' flight at RAF Manston. From January 1997 the Wessex was partly supplanted with the more modern Westland Puma HC.1. The squadron's Wessex HC.2s departed RAF Aldergrove on 25 March 2002, shortly before their retirement. No. 72 Squadron was then disbanded on 1 April 2002 at Aldergrove.

Training – Tucano to Texan

On 12 July 2002, No. 1 Flying Training School divided its strength between two new reserve squadrons – No. 72 (Reserve) Squadron and No. 207 (Reserve) Squadron, with both units operating the Short Tucano T.1 at RAF Linton-on-Ouse, North Yorkshire. No. 72 (Reserve) Squadron became No. 72 Squadron after the (Reserve) suffix was rescinded across the RAF on 1 February 2018. The final Tucano Basic Fast-jet Training (BFJT) course graduated on 25 October 2019, which was marked with a nine-ship flypast over the local area. No. 72 Squadron disbanded on 31 October 2019.

On 28 November 2019, the squadron stood-up at RAF Valley operating the Beechcraft Texan T.1.

On 13 November 2020, No. 72 Squadron became No. 72 (Fighter) Squadron to reflect its former role as a fighter unit.

Aircraft operated

See also
List of Royal Air Force aircraft squadrons

References
Citations

Bibliography

 Bowyer, Michael J.F. and John D.R. Rawlings. Squadron Codes, 1937-56. Cambridge, UK: Patrick Stephens Ltd., 1979. .
 Delve, Ken. The Source Book of the RAF. Shrewsbury, Shropshire, UK: Airlife Publishing, 1994. .
 Docherty, Tom. Swift to Battle: No. 72 Fighter Squadron RAF in Action, Volume 1: 1937 to 1942, Phoney War, Dunkirk, Battle of Britain, Offensive Operations. Barnsley, South Yorkshire, UK: Pen and Sword, 2009. .
 Docherty, Tom. Swift to Battle: No. 72 Fighter Squadron RAF in Action, Volume 2: 1942 to 1947, North Africa, Malta, Sicily, Southern France and Austria. Barnsley, South Yorkshire, UK: Pen and Sword, 2009. .
 Docherty, Tom. Swift to Battle: No. 72 Fighter Squadron RAF in Action, Volume 3: 1947 to 1961, Cold War Operations. Barnsley, South Yorkshire, UK: Pen and Sword, 2010. .
 Flintham, Vic and Andrew Thomas. Combat Codes: A full explanation and listing of British, Commonwealth and Allied air force unit codes since 1938. Shrewsbury, Shropshire, UK: Airlife Publishing Ltd., 2003. .

 Halley, James J. The Squadrons of the Royal Air Force & Commonwealth, 1918-1988. Tonbridge, Kent, UK: Air-Britain (Historians) Ltd., 1988. .
 Jackson, Ashley, The British Empire and the Second World War  (London/New York: Hambledon Continuumn, 2006).
 Jefford, C.G. RAF Squadrons, a Comprehensive Record of the Movement and Equipment of all RAF Squadrons and their Antecedents since 1912. Shrewsbury, Shropshire, UK: Airlife Publishing, 2001. .
 Rawlings, John D.R. Coastal, Support and Special Squadrons of the RAF and their Aircraft. London: Jane's Publishing Company Ltd., 1982. .
 Rawlings, John D.R. Fighter Squadrons of the RAF and their Aircraft. London: Macdonald and Jane's (Publishers) Ltd., 1969 (new edition 1976, reprinted 1978). .
 Robinson, Anthony. RAF Fighter Squadrons in the Battle of Britain. London: Arms and Armour Press Ltd., 1987 (Reprinted in 1999 by Brockhampton Press, .)
 Sturtivant, Ray, ISO and John Hamlin. RAF Flying Training And Support Units since 1912. Tonbridge, Kent, UK: Air-Britain (Historians) Ltd., 2007. .

External links

 Official RAF No.72 Squadron Website
 No.72 Squadron in art
 Photographs of No.72 Squadron's farewell visit and flypast at RAF North Weald, March 2002
 No 71 - 75 Squadron Histories

Flight training in the United Kingdom
072 Squadron
072 Squadron
Military units and formations established in 1917
1917 establishments in the United Kingdom
Military history of Basutoland during World War II